Ferdinand Samuel Laur (22 February 1791 – 2 July 1854) was a Swiss composer, conductor, choirmaster, and music teacher. He founded the Basel Choral Society in 1824. A hymnal he composed that was published in 1820 is now used in the national anthem of Lesotho, "Lesotho Fatse La Bontata Rona".

Career
"Freiheit", a hymn he composed that was published in 1820 is now used in the national anthem of Lesotho, "Lesotho Fatse La Bontata Rona". Between 1830 and 1840 he published the hymnbook Vierstimmige Chorgesänge und Chorlieder ohne Begleitung für Sopran, Alt, Tenor und Bass, für Kirchen, Schulen und Singanstalten.

He founded the Basel Choral Society in 1824.

Death

Personal life
Laur had a grandson, .

References

Further reading
 Albert Burckhardt und Rudolf Wackernagel: Basler Jahrbuch 1890. C. Detloffs Buchhandlung, Basel 1890, S. 94.
 Hermann Mendel: Musikalisches Conversations-Lexikon. Eine Encyklopädie der gesammten musikalischen Wissenschaften. Sechster Band. Robert Oppenheim, Berlin 1876, S. 263: https://archive.org/stream/musikalischesco09reisgoog#page/n270/mode/2up.
 Albert Burckhardt und Rudolf Wackernagel: Basler Jahrbuch 1890. C. Detloffs Buchhandlung, Basel 1890, S. 95.
 Rudolf Thommen: Festschrift zur Feier des hundertjährigen Bestehens des Basler Gesangvereins 1824–1924, Basel 1924. S. 2 und S. 19.
 Dora Iselin: Die Musikwissenschaft an den schweizerischen Universitäten. In: Mitteilungen der Internationalen Gesellschaft für Musikwissenschaft 1 (1929), S. 31–32.
 [ohne Autor]: Schweizerisches Musikfest in Basel vom 6ten bis 9ten Juli. In: Neue Zeitschrift für Musik 13 (1840), S. 59–60 (gesamte Rezension, S. 59 f. und 67 f.
 Ferdinand Laur: 24 Zweistimmige Religiöse Lieder in sehr leichten und fasslichen Melodien für Volksschulen. Basel ohne Jahr [um 1820?]; Ferdinand Laur: 50 Zweistimmige Gesänge in den gebräuchlichsten Dur und Moll Tonarten für Schulen und Gymnasien. Basel ohne Jahr [um 1830?]; Ferdinand Laur (Hrsg.): Vaterländische Lieder zur Feier des 26. Augusts als dem Jahrestage der Schlacht bei St. Jakob. H. Bienz Sohn, Basel 1824.
 Zofinger Vereine schweizerischer Studierender (Hrsg.): Lieder für Schweizerjünglinge. Zweite Auflage. Mit Singweisen für drei Männerstimmen. C. A. Jenni, Bern 1825.
 Ferdinand Laur: Frühlingslied. Bienz Sohn, Basel o. J.
 Ferdinand Laur: Kreisgesänge für drei gleiche Singstimmen. Bienz Sohn, Basel o. J.
 Beispielsweise in: Musik-Kommission des eidgenössischen Sängerheftes in Olten (Hrsg.): Allgemeine Liedersammlung des Eidgenössischen Sängervereins. Zweites Heft. R. J. Wuss, Bern 1860. Ohne Herausgeber [Borrani]: Mélodéon. Recueil de chants populaires anciens et nouveaux a une ou plusieurs voix, pour les écoles et les familles. Ohne Ort, ohne Jahr [Paris 1851?]: Mélodéon
 Albert Brutsch: From Work Song to National Anthem. In: Lesotho. Notes and Records 9 (1970/1971), S. 8.

1791 births
1854 deaths
National anthem writers
Swiss composers
People from Kreuzlingen District